Christopher Murphy Carley (born May 31, 1978) is an American actor who is sometimes credited as Chris Carley.

Carley was born in Suffern, New York to Elizabeth and Gerard Carley and grew up in Pearl River. He has two sisters, Cara and Sarah, and graduated from Pearl River High School in 1996.

Carley made his acting debut on Broadway in the 1998 production of The Beauty Queen of Leenane taking over the role of Ray. He also played "Second Bellboy" in Once in a Lifetime.

He has appeared in such television series as House M.D., Law & Order: Special Victims Unit, The Sopranos, and Veronica Mars. He also played a small role in the film Lions for Lambs. In 2008 he starred with Clint Eastwood in the film Gran Torino.

Filmography

References

External links

1978 births
Male actors from New York (state)
American male film actors
American male stage actors
American male television actors
People from Pearl River, New York
Living people